The Movie Songbook is the second studio album by Scottish singer-songwriter Sharleen Spiteri. It was released on 1 March 2010. The album consists of film song covers, chosen and recorded by Spiteri in 2009.

Overview
Spiteri had not intended to record another solo album following her debut, but instead return to working with her band Texas. On preparing to write however, she found it difficult to return to their soft rock style. At her record company's suggestion, she agreed to do a cover version album. The songs selected were Spiteri's own choices and she was happy with the outcome of the recordings.

On release however, the album met with a poor critical reception. Digitalspy.co.uk said of the album that: "A fair chunk of the song selection is so pedestrian it deserves its own crossing" and that the songs are "completely undone by their horrific arrangements". Allmusic said the album sounded "half-hearted" and like "karaoke" in a mostly negative review, but did comment on her "unquestionable singing talents".

The album failed to capture the success of her previous album, but still managed to hit the UK top 20 at number 13. "Xanadu" was released as the lead single.

Track listing

Chart performance

Personnel
 Produced by Phil Ramone, Sharleen Spiteri and Johnny McElhone
 Recorded by Al Schmitt
 Mixed by Johnny McElhone, except tracks 1 and 2 mixed by Tom Elmhirst

References

Sharleen Spiteri albums
2010 albums
Albums produced by Phil Ramone
Mercury Records albums
Covers albums